The canton of Vendeuvre-sur-Barse is an administrative division of the Aube department, northeastern France. Its borders were modified at the French canton reorganisation which came into effect in March 2015. Its seat is in Vendeuvre-sur-Barse.

It consists of the following communes:
 
Amance
Argançon
Beurey
Bossancourt
Bouranton
Bréviandes
Buchères
Champ-sur-Barse
Clérey
Courteranges
Dolancourt
Fresnoy-le-Château
Isle-Aumont
Jessains
Laubressel
La Loge-aux-Chèvres
Longpré-le-Sec
Lusigny-sur-Barse
Magny-Fouchard
Maison-des-Champs
Mesnil-Saint-Père
Montaulin
Montiéramey
Montmartin-le-Haut
Montreuil-sur-Barse
Moussey
Puits-et-Nuisement
Rouilly-Saint-Loup
Ruvigny
Saint-Léger-près-Troyes
Saint-Thibault
Thennelières
Trannes
Vauchonvilliers
Vendeuvre-sur-Barse
Verrières
La Villeneuve-au-Chêne

References

Cantons of Aube